The campaign of the Manuripi was an armed confrontation between Bolivian and  Peruvian troops and a group of indigenous people in 1910. The Bolivian press has treated this conflict as "forgotten" due to the little importance with which it is taken in the country's history, perhaps due to the singularity of the confrontation, since a treaty had already been signed several months ago that awarded those territories to Peru.

At that time, the borders between Peru and Bolivia were not well defined and the Argentine arbitration of July 9, 1909, caused tensions to rise. During this, Bolivian Captain Lino Echeverría and 16 men remained the small fortress of Avaroa, on the Manuripí River. This led to fighting, and on June 21, 1910, Echeverría repelled an attack by 25 Peruvians, with losses on both sides. This was followed by the Peruvian 5th Infantry Regiment, consisting of 180 men, 2 machine guns, and 20 canoes, landing at the confluence of the Manuripi and Mejahuirra rivers on July 22. It is believed that 
the arrest of a smuggler by Bolivian troops further heightened tensions. Two months later, a force of 150 Peruvian and indigenous soldiers presented an ultimatum to the fort held by Echeverria. During the ensuing attack, Echeverria and three other Bolivian soldiers were killed while defending the fort, and several prisoners were taken.

Legacy
In honor of Captain Echeverría, the "29th Infantry Regiment Cap. Lino Echeverría" was named in his honor in 1982. 

There is a controversy over the fact of Captain Echeverría's presence in the region.

According to the Bolivian point of view, this treaty —established on September 17, 1909— constituted a territorial victory for Lima, since most of the disputed territory became part of Peru. A general agreement between Peru and Bolivia was obtained in 1909 and was parallel to the revision of the Titicaca line. A landmark of this discussion was the Argentine arbitration process between Bolivia and Peru. The Argentine mediation on the Peruvian and Bolivian titles in the Acre, was settled against Bolivia in the Treaty of 1909, the same year in which Brazil and Peru would also have their verdict about the distribution, among others, of spoils of the Acre by Brazil and Peru: in this case the arbitration trial agreed with Peru. All these events apparently went unnoticed by Captain Echeverría Therefore, it is speculated that the captain was not informed of these diplomatic events between the two countries, which would explain his presence in the Manuripi.

References

 
P